Bērze Parish is an administrative unit of Dobele Municipality, Latvia.

Towns, villages and settlements of Bērze Parish 
Šķibe
Miltiņi
Bērze

References 

Dobele Municipality
Parishes of Latvia